Ring of Daring is a 1953 Soviet comedy film directed by Sergei Gurov and Yuriy Ozerov.

Plot 
The film features a circus performance, in which the most famous young circus performers of the USSR take part.

Starring 
 Oleg Popov as himself (lead clown)
 Eduard Sjereda as himself (clown)
 Artisti Shubini as Themselves (dancers-acrobats)
 Manuela Papyan as herself (dancer-contortionist)
 Abdulayev as himself (dancer-acrobat)
 Artisti Kozhukovoi as Themselves (jugglers)
 Violetta Kriss as herself (acrobat)
 Aleksandr Kriss as himself (acrobat)
 Gruppe Vitushi Muldavi as Themselves (dance troupe)
 Boris Bressler as himself (acrobat)
 Shkodnikov as himself (clown)

References

External links 
 

1953 films
Soviet comedy films
1950s Russian-language films